"That's My Desire" is a 1931 popular song with music by Helmy Kresa and lyrics by Carroll Loveday.

The highest-charting version of the song was recorded by the Sammy Kaye orchestra in 1946, although a version of the song recorded by Frankie Laine has become better known over the years, being one of Laine's best-known recordings. It has been recorded by many other singers, including a number of doo-wop groups.

Charted hit versions

The recording by the Sammy Kaye orchestra was released by RCA Victor Records as catalog number 20-2251, with the flip side "Red Silk Stockings and Green Perfume". It first reached the Billboard Best Seller chart on June 13, 1947 and lasted 17 weeks on the chart, peaking at No. 2.

The recording by Frankie Laine was recorded on August 27, 1946, with Mannie Klein's Orchestra, and released by Mercury Records as catalog number 5007, with the flip side "By the River Sainte Marie". It reached the Billboard Best Seller chart on June 27, 1947 and lasted four weeks on the chart, peaking at No. 4. It was Laine's first chart hit. Despite the higher chart position of the Kaye version, the Laine version is the widely reported million-seller. The Laine version also appeared on Billboard′s Most- Played Juke Box Race Records chart, peaking at No. 4.

The recording by Hadda Brooks on the smaller Modern Records label also peaked at No. 4 on the R&B chart in 1947.

The Hollies' version, recorded in Abbey Road studios 1 March 1965 appeared on the group's third LP. In South Africa and Rhodesia it was released as a single, and went to No. 1 in both countries in 1967.

Eddie Cochran version
Eddie Cochran recorded his version of "That's My Desire" in early summer of 1956 at Gold Star Recording Studios. It was first released in the UK in 1962 on the album "Cherished Memories". The first release in the US was on the album Eddie Cochran On The Air in 1987.

Personnel on the session:
 Eddie Cochran: vocal, guitar
 Conrad 'Guybo' Smith: stand-up bass
 Jerry Capehart: box slapping

Other versions
Ronnie Dove recorded the song in 1967 for his album, The Best of Ronnie Dove Volume 2.
Louis Armstrong and his orchestra (recorded March 19, 1947, released by Decca Records as catalog numbers 28105 and 28106, with the flip side "On the Sunny Side of the Street"; re-recorded July 1952, released by Decca Records as catalog number 28372, with the flip side "Baby, It's Cold Outside").
Hadda Brooks (1947)
Butanes (1961) 
Chuck Carbo and The Spiders (recorded November 29, 1956, released by Imperial Records as catalog number 5423, with the flip side "Honey Bee").
The Cats and the Fiddle (vocal by Austin Powell; released by Manor Records as catalog number 1064, with the flip side "When Elephants Roost in Bamboo Trees").
The Channels (1957)
Patsy Cline (1962)
Chris Connor (recorded January 28, 1960, released by Atlantic Records as catalog number 2053, with the flip side "I Only Want Some").
Dion & the Belmonts (1959), released by Laurie Records as catalog number 3044, with the flip side "Where or When".
Epics (1962) 
Ella Fitzgerald with Bob Haggart's Orchestra and the Andy Love Quintet (recorded 1947, released by Decca Records as catalog number 23866, later re-issued as catalog number 28993 both with the flip side "A Sunday Kind of Love").
Flamingos (recorded January 28, 1953, released by Chance Records as catalog number 1140, with the flip side "Hurry Home Baby").
Gogi Grant on her 1959 album Granted - It's Gogi
Woody Herman and his orchestra (recorded March 19, 1947, released by Columbia Records as catalog number 37329, with the flip side "Ivy").
Buddy Holly (1958)
The Lettermen (1961)
Jerry Lee Lewis (1956)
Al Martino
Art Mooney and his orchestra (vocal: Bud Breese; recorded 1947, released by MGM Records as catalog number 10020B, with the flip side "Mahzel").
Piano Red (released by Groove Records as catalog number G-0145, with the flip side "I'm Nobody's Fool").
Cliff Richard (1959, on his album Cliff Sings).
Jim Reeves (1957 on the album Jim Reeves)
The Shadows (1961, on the album The Shadows).
Nana Mouskouri (1962, on the album The Girl from Greece Sings).
Nat Shilkret and the Victor Orchestra (recorded June 9, 1931, released under the name "Ronald Sachs and his Orchestra" by Timely Tunes Records as catalog number C-1584, with the flip side "Swamp Ghosts").
Martha Tilton (recorded March 1947, released by Capitol Records as catalog number 395, with the flip side "I Wonder, I Wonder").
James Brown (1969)
Maynard Ferguson performed vocals and trumpet on a version that appeared on his 1995 album Footpath Cafe.
Yvonne Baker and the Sensations (April 1962 on ARGO 5412; No. 69 on Billboard Hot 100 June 1962)

Related versions
On the eponymous first album by The Manhattan Transfer, the group does a song called "Heart's Desire" that is virtually identical to "That's My Desire".

References
 

Songs with music by Helmy Kresa
1931 songs
Patsy Cline songs
James Brown songs
Louis Armstrong songs
Eddie Cochran songs
Frankie Laine songs